Idaho Legislative District 8 is one of 35 districts of the Idaho Legislature. It is currently represented by Steven Thayn, Republican of Emmett, Terry Gestrin, Republican of Donnelly, and Dorothy Moon, Republican of Stanley.

District profile (2022- ) 
With 2022 redistricting, District 8 now consists of Boise, Custer, Elmore, and Valley Counties. (https://www.mtexpress.com/news/state_regional/state-panel-approves-idaho-redistricting-plans/article_5d3f8efa-4182-11ec-9d62-3bf54d4056b7.html)

District profile (1992–2002) 
From 1992 to 2002, District 8 consisted of Adams, Boise, and Valley Counties and a portion of Idaho and Gem Counties.

District profile (2002–2012) 
From 2002 to 2012, District 8 consisted of Clearwater, Idaho, Lewis, and Valley Counties.

District profile (2012–2022) 
District 8 currently consists of Boise, Custer, Gem, Lemhi, and Valley Counties.

District profile (2022–) 
In December 2022, District 8 will consist of Valley, Boise, Custer, and Elmore Counties.

See also

 List of Idaho Senators
 List of Idaho State Representatives

References

External links
Idaho Legislative District Map (with members)
Idaho Legislature (official site)

08
Boise County, Idaho
Custer County, Idaho
Gem County, Idaho
Lemhi County, Idaho
Valley County, Idaho